Chloroclystis muscosa is a moth in the  family Geometridae. It is found in Ethiopia, Kenya, Malawi and South Africa.

Subspecies
Chloroclystis muscosa muscosa
Chloroclystis muscosa tumefacta Prout, 1917 (Malawi, South Africa)

References

Moths described in 1902
Chloroclystis
Moths of Africa